Anthony and the Camp is a dance music group led by producer Anthony Malloy.  The group also consists of Crawford Peterson, Henley Goddard and Linden Aaron.  Malloy, who already had a number-one hit on the Hot Dance Music/Club Play chart with his former group Temper, hit the top spot again with the Camp in 1986 with the song "What I Like".

"What I Like" spent three weeks at the top of dance charts and was ranked as the most successful dance single of 1986. It also briefly appeared on the U.S. R&B Singles chart, peaking at number eighty.

See also
List of number-one dance hits (United States)
List of artists who reached number one on the U.S. dance chart

References

American dance music groups